The Dollart (German name) or Dollard (Dutch name) is a bay in the Wadden Sea between the northern Netherlands and Germany, on the west side of the estuary of the Ems river. Most of it dries at low tide. Many water birds feed there.

Gaining from and losing to the sea 

According to legend, the Dollart Bay was created by a catastrophic storm surge in 1277, covering the district of Reiderland and large parts of the Oldambt district. The flood was rumoured to have caused 80,000 deaths. The story, however, is not true and based on legend instead of facts. The Dollart was created as a slow inundation over many centuries which accumulated in a storm surge in 1509. The 1509 surge extended the Dollart, and flooded 30 more villages, and by 1520 the Dollart had its largest extension. Between the 16th and the 20th centuries, two thirds of the drowned area was reclaimed again.

Nowadays the unembanked forelands have been declared world natural heritage, as they are a paradise for all kinds of birds and other aquatic species.

Border dispute 

The Netherlands and Germany do not agree on the exact course of the border through the bay, yet they have agreed to disagree by signing a treaty in 1960, laying out mutual responsibilities. Around 2011, the territorial dispute gained relevance with plans for the Borkum Riffgat offshore wind farm. The question about use and administration of the territorial waters between 3 and 12 nautical miles (where the wind farm is located) was settled with another treaty in 2014 by defining a "line", while the border dispute itself remained unresolved.

Literature
 K. Essink (ed.), Stormvloed 1509. Geschiedenis van de Dollard, Groningen: Stichting Verdronken Geschiedenis 2013 (online) 
 O.S. Knottnerus, 'Reclamations and submerged lands in the Ems River Estuary (900-1500)'. In: Erik Thoen et al. (eds.), Landscapes or seascapes?. The history of the coastal environment in the North Sea area reconsidered, Turnhout 2013, S. 241–266.
 Gozewinus Acker Stratingh und G.A. Venema, De Dollard of geschied,- aardrijks- en natuurkundige beschrijving van dezen boezem der Eems, Groningen 1855, repr. 1979
 Frank Westerman: De graanrepubliek. Atlas, Amsterdam/Antwerpen 1999, erweitert 2009. [Deutsche Ausgabe Das Getreideparadies. Ch. Links, Berlin 2009, .]

References

External links 
 

Bays of the Netherlands
Bays of Lower Saxony
Bodies of water of Groningen (province)
Germany–Netherlands border
Ramsar sites in Germany
Disputed waters